Quinchao is a Chilean commune located in Chiloé Province, Los Lagos Region. The seat of government lies in the town of Achao on the island.

Geography
The commune of Quinchao includes most of the Quinchao Island (sharing its territory with the commune of Curaco de Vélez), and it also incorporates nine nearby islands: Alao, Apia, Chaulinec and Cahuache (or Caguach), Lin-Lin, Llingua, Meulín, Quenac and Teuquelín. These islands all lie within the Gulf of Corcovado east of Chile's second largest island, Chiloé, which separates the Chiloé Archipelago from mainland Chile.

Demographics
According to the 2002 census of the National Statistics Institute, Quinchao has 8,976 inhabitants (4,417 men and 4,559 women). Of these, 3,452 (38.5%) lived in urban areas and 5,524 (61.5%) in rural areas. The population fell by 1.2% (112 persons) between the 1992 and 2002 censuses.

Administration
The municipal building is the town of Achao. As a commune, Quinchao is a third-level administrative division of Chile administered by a municipal council, headed by an alcalde who is directly elected every four years. The 2008-2012 alcalde is Santiago Torres Águila (ILC).

Within the electoral divisions of Chile, Quinchao is represented in the Chamber of Deputies by Gabriel Ascencio (PDC) and Alejandro Santana (RN) as part of the 58th electoral district, together with Castro, Ancud, Quemchi, Dalcahue, Curaco de Vélez, Puqueldón, Chonchi, Queilén, Quellón, Chaitén, Hualaihué, Futaleufú and Palena. The commune is represented in the Senate by Camilo Escalona Medina (PS) and Carlos Kuschel Silva (RN) as part of the 17th senatorial constituency (Los Lagos Region).

UNESCO sites
In 2000, UNESCO declared the 16 Churches of Chiloé to be World Heritage Sites, and the commune of Quinchao contains 3 such churches in the towns of Achao, Quinchao and on the island of Caguach.

References

External links
  Municipality of Quinchao

Communes of Chile
Populated places in Chiloé Province